In general, Subclavian means beneath the clavicle, and it may refer to: 
 Subclavian vein
 Subclavian artery
 Subclavian nerve (part of the Brachial plexus)